Camille Aoustin (born 13 February 1990) is a French handballer who plays for Hungarian club Siófok KC.

Achievements
Championnat de France:
Winner: 2016 
Coupe de la Ligue :
Finalist: 2009
EHF Cup:
Winner: 2019

References

1990 births
Living people
People from Cherbourg-Octeville
French female handball players
Sportspeople from Manche
French expatriate sportspeople in Hungary